Wesleyville is a borough in Erie County, Pennsylvania, United States. The population was 3,229 at the 2020 census, down from 3,341 in 2010. It is part of the Erie Metropolitan Statistical Area.

Geography
Wesleyville is located at  (42.137056, -80.012392). It is bordered to the west by the city of Erie, to the north by Lawrence Park Township, and to the east and south by Harborcreek Township.

Fourmile Creek, a tributary of Lake Erie, forms the eastern border of the borough.

Demographics

As of the census of 2000, there were 3,617 people, 1,441 households, and 938 families residing in the borough. The population density was 6,765.4 people per square mile (2,635.0/km²). There were 1,512 housing units at an average density of 2,828.1 per square mile (1,101.5/km²). The racial makeup of the borough was 96.71% White, 1.08% African American, 0.28% Native American, 0.22% Asian, 0.03% Pacific Islander, 0.50% from other races, and 1.19% from two or more races. Hispanic or Latino of any race were 1.69% of the population.

There were 1,441 households, out of which 31.4% had children under the age of 18 living with them, 48.3% were married couples living together, 12.1% had a female householder with no husband present, and 34.9% were non-families. 27.2% of all households were made up of individuals, and 9.6% had someone living alone who was 65 years of age or older. The average household size was 2.51 and the average family size was 3.04.

In the borough the population was spread out, with 24.3% under the age of 18, 13.5% from 18 to 24, 28.2% from 25 to 44, 21.1% from 45 to 64, and 12.9% who were 65 years of age or older. The median age was 34 years. For every 100 females there were 99.6 males. For every 100 females age 18 and over, there were 97.8 males.

The median income for a household in the borough was $33,144, and the median income for a family was $42,694. Males had a median income of $32,000 versus $23,971 for females. The per capita income for the borough was $15,644. About 7.3% of families and 11.8% of the population were below the poverty line, including 12.3% of those under age 18 and 12.7% of those age 65 or over.

References

External links
 Borough of Wesleyville official website

Populated places established in 1828
Boroughs in Erie County, Pennsylvania
1828 establishments in Pennsylvania